Dwight Weist, Jr. (January 16, 1910 - July 16, 1991) was an actor and announcer in the era of old-time radio.

Early years
The son of Mr. and Mrs. Dwight W. Weist, he was born in Palo Alto, California, but was raised in Scranton, Pennsylvania. He attended Scranton's Central High School, where he participated in dramatics. He was a 1931 graduate of Ohio Wesleyan University, where he participated in debate, and he acted in the Cleveland Play House theater company.

Radio
Weist debuted on radio in Columbus, Ohio, working as an announcer on WAIU while he was a college student. He also worked on WGBI in Scranton, relating instructions about playing bridge.

Weist was called "the man of 1,000 voices," primarily as a result of his work on The March of Time. His obituary in The New York Times explained, "Mr. Weist, who played Adolf Hitler and Franklin D. Roosevelt, among many others, received his nickname because of his ability to imitate a broad range of accents and ages." Weist even made an adjustment in 1935 after Hitler had surgery to create a milder, more soothing vocal tone. Some of Weist's friends watched as he listened to a speech by Hitler and immediately afterward spoke in the newer tone himself. When he was assigned roles of people with whose voices he was unfamiliar, he listened to them in newsreels and on radio to develop his impersonations.

His roles on radio programs included those shown in the table below.

Weist also wrote scripts for radio programs, at least two of which were produced: "The Death of Adolph Hitler on The Kate Smith Hour and "Evening Call", produced by the Radio Guild.

Film and television
In the 1940s, Weist's voice was heard on Pathé newsreels in movie theaters. He also was heard in the film Zelig and was shown announcing the Pearl Harbor attack in Radio Days. He narrated the short films State Trooper, about the Connecticut State Police, and Here Come the Yanks, about the National War Fund.

He was the voice of the character Adso (Christian Slater) as an old man, in the 1986 movie "The Name of the Rose".

He also played a role in the 1986 erotic romantic drama film 9½ Weeks.

On television, Weist was the announcer on Search for Tomorrow and worked on Walter Cronkite's Sunday News Special and Guy Lombardo's Diamond Jubilee.

Other professional activities
In 1956, Weist and Bob Barron began the Weist-Barron School to teach commercial acting in New York City—an institution that has evolved into the Weist-Barron School of Television and the Weist-Barron-Hill Acting School, with campuses in New York City and Los Angeles. Weist taught there for 35 years.

Commuting by air
When Weist worked in New York City, he and his family lived on the shore of Lake Tomahawk in Orange County, New York, and he traveled to and from work by plane. He bought his first aircraft, a Fairchild, in 1940, before he learned how to fly. After World War II began, he sold the Fairchild to the government for use as a training plane. Later he bought a Seabee seaplane (manufactured by Republic Aircraft), which he moored at a dock near the family's home. The plane's 105 mph cruising speed enabled him to reach the city in 30 minutes, rather than the 140 minutes that driving typically required.

Personal life
In 1935, Weist married Elizabeth Maxwell, a registered nurse, in Manhattan. While at home, he often worked in his garden. He also had a workshop in New York City in which he worked on toys and other wooden products during time between radio programs. After they divorced, he married Avery Hathaway on April 25, 1956.

Death
Weist died July 16, 1991, of a heart attack in Block Island, Rhode Island. He was 81. He was survived by three sisters, four sons, a daughter, and seven grandchildren.

References

External links 

 

1910 births
1991 deaths
20th-century American male actors
American male radio actors
American soap opera actors
Male actors from Palo Alto, California
Ohio Wesleyan University alumni
Radio and television announcers
Radio personalities from California